Boudreaux is a surname of French origin and is a common name among Cajuns. The name refers to:

Donald J. Boudreaux (contemporary), American professor of law and economics
Gail Koziara Boudreaux (contemporary), American businesswoman in the health care industry
John "Buddy" Boudreaux (b. 1917), American big band and jazz musician from Baton Rouge, Louisiana
John Boudreaux (b. 1936), American drummer
Monk Boudreaux (b. 1941), American chief of the Mardi Gras Indians in Louisiana
Randy Boudreaux (contemporary), American country-music songwriter and producer
Bella Donna Boudreaux an assassin in the Marvel Comics's X-Men
Parker Boudreaux, American professional wrestler

Other uses 

Boudreaux's Butt Paste, an American skin cream that started out as a diaper rash remedy
Boudreaux and Thibodeaux, traditional Cajun jokes

French-language surnames